Mödingen is a municipality in the district of Dillingen in Bavaria in Germany.

The municipality includes the villages Bergheim and Mödingen.

References

Dillingen (district)